Moroccan literature is the literature produced by people who lived in or were culturally connected to Morocco and the historical states that have existed partially or entirely within the geographical area that is now Morocco. Apart from the various forms of oral literature, the written literature of Morocco encompasses various genres, including poetry, prose, theater, and nonfiction like religious literature. Moroccan literature was and is mainly written in Arabic, however it was also written at a lesser extent in Berber languages, Hebrew, French, and Spanish. Through translations into English and other languages, Moroccan literature originally written in Arabic or one of the other native languages has become accessible to readers worldwide.

Most of what is known as Moroccan literature was created since the arrival of Islam in the 8th century, before which native Berber communities primarily had oral literary traditions.

Classical antiquity 

Morocco has been associated with Phoenician mythology, as a temple to Melqart was found in the vicinity of Lixus.

Morocco also played a part in the Greco-Roman Mythology. Atlas is associated with the Atlas Mountains and is said to have been the first king of Mauretania. Also associated with Morocco is Hercules, who was given the 12 impossible tasks including stealing "golden apples" from the garden of the Hesperides, purported to have been in or around Lixus.

Juba II, King of Mauretania, was a man of letters who authored works in Latin and Greek. Pliny the Elder mentioned him in his Natural History.

Little is known of the literary production in the time of the Exarchate of Africa.

Mauro-Andalusi 
According to Abdallah Guennoun's an-Nubugh ul-Maghrebi fi l-Adab il-Arabi ( Moroccan Excellence in Arabic Literature), Moroccan literature in Arabic can be traced back to a Friday sermon given by Tariq ibn Ziyad at the time of the conquest of Iberia. For part of its history, Moroccan literature and literature in al-Andalus can be considered as one, since Morocco and al-Andalus were united under the Almoravid and Almohad empires. Additionally, a number of Andalusi writers went to Morocco for different reasons; some, such as Al-Mu'tamid ibn Abbad, Maimonides, Ibn al-Khatib, and Leo Africanus were forced to leave, while others, such as Ibn Rushd, went in search of opportunity.

Yahya ibn Yahya al-Laythi, a Muslim scholar of Masmuda Berber ancestry and a grandson of one of the conquerors of al-Andalus, was responsible for spreading Maliki jurisprudence in al-Andalus and the Maghreb and is considered the most important transmitter of Malik ibn Anas's Muwatta (compilation of Hadith).

Idrissid Period 
Sebta, Tangier, Basra (a settlement founded by the Idrissids near al-Qasar al-Kebir), and Asilah were important cultural centers during the Idrissid period.

Barghwata 
Al-Bakri mentions in his Book of Roads and Kingdoms that Salih ibn Tarif, king of the Barghawata, professed to be a prophet, and claimed that a new Quran was revealed to him. Ibn Khaldun also mentions the "Quran of Salih" in Kitāb al-ʿIbar, writing that it contained "surahs" named after prophets such as Adam, Noah, and Moses, as well as after animals such as the rooster, the camel, and the elephant.

University of al-Qarawiyyin 

Fatima al-Fihri founded al-Qarawiyiin University in 859. Particularly from the beginning of the 12th century, the University of al-Qarawiyyin in Fes played an important role in the development of Moroccan literature, welcoming scholars and writers from throughout the Maghreb, al-Andalus, and the Mediterranean Basin. Among the scholars who studied and taught there were Ibn Khaldoun, Ibn al-Khatib, Al-Bannani, al-Bitruji, Ibn Hirzihim (Sidi Harazim) and Al-Wazzan (Leo Africanus) as well as the Jewish theologian Maimonides and the Catholic Pope Sylvester II. The writings of Sufi leaders have played an important role in literary and intellectual life in Morocco from this early period (e.g. Abu-l-Hassan ash-Shadhili and al-Jazouli) until now (e.g. Muhammad ibn al-Habib).

Judeo-Moroccan literature 
An early example of Judeo-Moroccan literature is the 9th century Risalah of Judah ibn Kuraish to the Jews of Fes, written in Judeo-Arabic with Hebrew script.

Almoravid 

The writings of Abu Imran al-Fasi, a Moroccan Maliki scholar, influenced Yahya Ibn Ibrahim and the early Almoravid movement. From 1086, Morocco and al-Andalus, with its rich literary tradition from the Umayyads, formed one state under the Almoravid dynasty. The cultural interchange between Morocco and al-Andalusi rapidly accelerated with this political unification and Almoravid sultans stimulated culture in their courts and in the country. This process began when Yusuf Bin Tashfiin, upon taking control of al-Andalus after the Battle of az-Zallaqah (Sagrajas), and continued with al-Mu'tamid Bin Abbad, poet king of the Taifa of Seville, to Tangier and ultimately Aghmat.

The historian Ibn Hayyan lived the end of his life in the Almoravid empire, as did Al-Bakri, author of Roads and Kingdoms. Ibn Bassam dedicated his anthology adh-Dhakhira fî mahâsin ahl al-Gazira to Abu-Bakr Ibn-Umar and al-Fath ibn Khaqan his Qala-id al-Iqyan to Yusuf ibn Tashfin.

In the Almoravid period two writers stand out: Ayyad ben Moussa and Ibn Bajja. Ayyad is known for having authored Kitāb al-Shifāʾ bīTaʾrif Ḥuqūq al-Muṣṭafá.

Zajal 
Under the Almoravids, Mauro-Andalusi strophic zajal poetry flourished. In his Muqaddimah, Ibn Khaldun discusses the development of zajal in al-Andalus under the Almoravids, mentioning Ibn Quzman, Ibn Zuhr, and others. Although Andalusi zajal was originally composed in the local Arabic of Cordoba, Ibn Khaldun also mentions the importance of zajal in Moroccan cities such as Fes.

Muwashah 
A great number of great poets from the Almoravid period in al-Andalus, such as the master of muwashahat Al-Tutili, Ibn Baqi, Ibn Khafaja and Ibn Sahl, are mentioned in anthological works such as Kharidat al-Qasr, Ibn Dihya's Al Mutrib, and Abū Ṭāhir al-Silafī's Mujam as-Sifr.

Almohad 

Under the Almohad dynasty (1147–1269) Morocco experienced another period of prosperity and brilliance of learning. The Imam Ibn Tumart, the founding leader of the Almohad movement, authored a book entitled E'az Ma Yutlab ( The Most Noble Calling).

The Almohad rulers built the Marrakech Koutoubia Mosque, which accommodated no fewer than 25,000 people, but was also famed for its books, manuscripts, libraries and book shops, which gave it its name; the first book bazaar in history. The Almohad sultan Abu Yaqub Yusuf had a great love for collecting books. He founded a great private library, which was eventually moved to the kasbah of Marrakech and turned into a public library. Under the Almohads, the sovereigns encouraged the construction of schools and sponsored scholars of every sort. Ibn Rushd (Averroes), Ibn Tufail, Ibn al-Abbar, Ibn Amira and many more poets, philosophers and scholars found sanctuary and served the Almohad rulers. The poet Hafsa bint al-Hajj al-Rukuniyya settled in at the Almohad court in Marrakesh and taught the sultan's family.

 argues that it was under the Almohads that madrasas first appeared in Morocco, starting under the reign of Abd al-Mu'min, in order to train those who would take roles in the empire's leadership and administration.

In this period, Ibn Arabi established himself in Fes and studied under Mohammed ibn Qasim al-Tamimi, author of An-Najm al-Mushriqa.

Judeo-Moroccan literature in the Middle Ages 
Jewish culture experienced a golden age in the medieval Western Islamic world, particularly in literature. Among the most prominent Jewish writers of this period were Isaac Alfasi, Joseph ben Judah ibn Aknin, and Maimonides, author of The Guide for the Perplexed.

Twilight of Mauro-Andalusi literature 
Lisan ad-Din Ibn al-Khatib, considered the "last great man of letters" of the Mauro-Andalusi tradition, spent significant periods of his life exiled in Morocco, and was executed in Fes. Hasan ibn Muhammad al-Wazzan, who would later take the name Leo Africanus and write the Cosmographia et geographia de Affrica, also lived in Morocco after the fall of Granada in 1492, before being captured and taken to the Papal States.

Marinid 
Abulbaqaa' ar-Rundi, who was from Ronda and died in Ceuta, composed his qasida nuniyya "Elegy for al-Andalus" in the year 1267; this poem is a rithā', or lament, mourning the fall of most major Andalusi cities to the Catholic monarchs in the wake of the Almohad Caliphate's collapse, and also calling the Marinid Sultanate on the African coast to take arms in support of Islam in Iberia.

Sultans of the Marinid dynasty (1215–1420) stimulated learning and literature; Sultan Abu al-Hasan Ali ibn Othman built a madrasa in Salé and Sultan Abu Inan Faris (r. 1349–1358) built madrasas in Meknes and Fes. At his invitation the icon of Moroccan literature Ibn Batuta returned to settle down in the city of Fes and write , his Rihla or travelogue, in cooperation with Ibn Juzayy. Abdelaziz al-Malzuzi (-1298) and Malik ibn al-Murahhal (1207–1300) are considered as the two greatest poets of the Marinid era. Historiographers were, among many others, Ismail ibn al-Ahmar and Ibn Idhari. Poets of Al-Andalus, like Ibn Abbad al-Rundi (1333–1390) and Salih ben Sharif al-Rundi (1204–1285) settled in Morocco, often forced by the political situation of the Nasrid kingdom. Both Ibn al-Khatib (1313–1374) and Ibn Zamrak, vizirs and poets whose poems can be read on the walls of the Alhambra, found shelter here. The heritage left by the literature of this time that saw the flowering of Al-Andalus and the rise of three Berber dynasties had its impact on Moroccan literature throughout the following centuries.

The first record of a work of literature composed in Moroccan Darija was Al-Kafif az-Zarhuni's al-Mala'ba, written in the period of Sultan Abu al-Hasan Ali ibn Othman.

Muhammad al-Jazuli, one of the Seven Saints of Marrakesh, wrote Dala'il al-Khayrat, a Sufi prayer book with a wide impact throughout the Islamic world, in the 15th century.

Wattasid period 

In 1516, Samuel ibn Ishaq Nedivot and his son Isaac, Andalusi Jewish refugees from Lisbon, printed the first printed book on the African continent: a copy of Sefer Abudarham in Fes.

Saadi period 

The possession of manuscripts of famous writers remained the pride of courts and zawiyas throughout the history of Morocco until the modern times. The great Saadian ruler Ahmed al-Mansour (r.1578–1603) was a poet king. Poets of his court were Ahmad Ibn al-Qadi, Abd al-Aziz al-Fishtali. Ahmed Mohammed al-Maqqari lived during the reign of his sons. The Saadi Dynasty contributed greatly to the library of the Taroudannt. Another library established in time that was that of Tamegroute—part of it remains today. By a strange coincidence the complete library of Sultan Zaydan an-Nasser as-Saadi has also been transmitted to us to the present day. Due to circumstances in a civil war, Sultan Zaydan (r.1603–1627) had his complete collection transferred to a ship, which was commandeered by Spain. The collection was taken to El Escorial palace and remains there until the present.

Tarikh as-Sudan, of the Timbuktu Chronicles, was composed by Abd ar-Rahman as-Sa’di, a chronicler from Timbuktu who served Morocco as governor of Djenné and head administrator of the Arma bureaucracy. It is considered the most important primary source document on the Songhai Empire.

Ahmad Baba al-Timbukti was among the greatest scholars of Timbuktu when it was conquered by the Saadi Sultanate, and he continued his scholarly activities after being exiled to Fes. In addition to writing prolifically in law, grammar, fiqh, and literature, he wrote The Ladder of Ascent in Obtaining the Procurements of the Sudan, responding to a Moroccan's questions about slavery in the Bilad as-Sudan.

Ahmad ibn Qasim Al-Hajarī known as Afoqai al-Andalusi composed a rihla entitled Riḥlat al-Shihāb ilá liqāʼ al-aḥbāb.

Some of the main genres differed from what was prominent in European countries: 
lyrics for songs (religious poetry, but also elegies and love poems)
biographies and historical chronicles like the Nuzhat al-hadi bi-akhbar muluk al-qarn al-hadi of Mohammed al-Ifrani (1670–1745), and the chronicles of Muhammad al-Qadiri (1712–1773).
accounts of journeys like the rihla of Ahmed ibn Nasir (1647–1717)
religious treatises and letters like those of Muhammad al-Arabi al-Darqawi (1760–1823) and Ahmad Ibn Idris Al-Fasi (1760–1837)

Famous Moroccan poets of this period were Abderrahman El Majdoub, Al-Masfiwi, Muhammad Awzal and Hemmou Talb.

Alawi period 

In 1737, the Shaykh Muhammad al-Mu’ta bin al-Salih al-Sharqi began his work on Dhakhirat al-Muhtaj fi sala ‘ala Sahib al-Liwa wat-taj, an influential Sufi book on prayer, dhikr, and repentance.

Ahmed at-Tijani, originally from Aïn Madhi in Algeria, lived in Fes, associated with the North African literary elite, and later established the Tijaniyyah Sufi order. The Ulama' of the Tijaniyyah order, with Fes as their spiritual capital, were among the most prolific producers of literature in the Islamic West.

In the year 1886, the historian Mohammed Akensus al-Murrakushi authored his magnum opus al-Jaysh al-ʻaramram al-khumāsī fī dawlat awlād Mawlānā ʻAlī al-Sajilmāsī on the reign of Sultan Mohammed ben Abdallah.

The Rabbi of Tetuan Isaac Ben Walid wrote Vayomer Yitzhak chronicling the history of the Jews of Tetuan, a city considered a capital of Sephardic or Andalusi Jews in Morocco following the fall of al-Andalus.

Lithographic press 
In 1864, Muhammad Ibn at-Tayib ar-Rudani of Taroudant brought to Morocco the country's first Arabic printing press from Egypt upon his return from the Hajj, as well as a servant from Egypt to operate it. The press—al-Matba'a as-Sa'ida as it was called—used lithography, which was more amenable to the particularities of Arabic script than movable type. Its first publication was an edition of Al-Tirmidhi's ash-Shama'il al-Muhammadiyya in 1871.

In the 1890s, Ahmad ibn Khalid an-Nasiri published the landmark al-Istiqsa—a multivolume history of Morocco with in-text citations including non-Islamic sources. It's the country's first comprehensive national history, covering the period from the Muslim conquest of the Maghreb to the reign of Sultan Abdelaziz.

A popular work of the period was Muḥammad ibn Jaʿfar al-Kattānī's 1908 Nasihat ahl al-Islam. Another was  al-Mi'yar al-Jadid, which discussed sharia and the social reality of the moment in connection with each other.

Literature in resistance to colonialism 
The Moroccan literary elite was influenced by the ideas of the Nahda in the Mashriq. Jamal ad-Din al-Afghani and Muhammad Abduh's Islamic revolutionary journal Al-Urwah al-Wuthqa circulated in Morocco. Muhammad Bin Abdul-Kabir al-Kattani—poet, man of letters, and shaykh of the Kattaniyya Sufi order—employed the written word as an instrument of resistance to metastasizing French presence in Morocco. He supported Lissan-ul-Maghreb and published at-Tā'ūn, both of which opposed the French propaganda of Es-Saada.

The Shaykh Ma al-'Aynayn left a number of works including Mubṣir al-mutashawwif ʻalá Muntakhab al-Taṣawwuf,  as did his son Ahmed al-Hiba who wrote Sirāj aẓ-ẓulam fī mā yanfaʿu al-muʿallim wa'l-mutaʿallim.

20th century
Three generations of writers especially shaped 20th-century Moroccan literature. During this century, this literature started to reflect the linguistic and cultural diversity of the country by using different languages, such as Classical Arabic, Dialectal Arabic, French, and Berber languages. The first was the generation that lived and wrote during the Protectorate (1912–56), and its most important representative was Mohammed Ben Brahim (1897–1955). The second generation played an important role in the transition to independence, with writers like Abdelkrim Ghallab (1919–2006), Allal al-Fassi (1910–1974) and Mohammed al-Mokhtar Soussi (1900–1963). The third generation is that of writers of the 1960s. Moroccan literature then flourished with writers such as Mohamed Choukri, Driss Chraïbi, Mohamed Zafzaf and Driss El Khouri. Abdelkebir Khatibi, author of Le roman maghrébin and Maghreb pluriel, was a prominent writer and literary critic publishing in French.

Colonial period 
The Moroccan literary scene in the early 20th century was marked by exposure to literature from the wider Arab world and Europe, while also suffering from colonial censorship. Abdellah Guennoun authored an-Nubūgh al-Maghribī fī al-adab al-ʻArabī on the history of Moroccan literature in three volumes. It was censored by the French authorities.

During the colonial period, a great number of manuscripts were taken from Morocco or disappeared.

Moroccan novel 
Critics differ on when the Moroccan novel first emerged due to the variety of novel-like texts that appeared in Morocco between 1924, the year of  ar-Rihla al-Murrakeshiya ( The Marrakesh Journey), and 1967, the year of Mohammed Aziz Lahbabi's Jīl adh-Dhama' ( Generation of Thirst). Some identify the beginning as Abdelmajid Benjelloun's Fi at-Tufula ( In Childhood) in 1957, while others point to Tuhami al-Wazzani's az-Zawiyya ( The Zawiya) in 1942. The Moroccan novel in this foundational period conformed with traditional features of early 20th century Arabic novels: a third-person omniscient narrator, a linear narrative and storyline, direct preaching and lesson-giving, and the author's own explanation of events and commentary on them.

Tangier literary scene 

The city of Tangier, administered internationally during the colonial period, became a literary and artistic hub. Mohamed Choukri, author of For Bread Alone, and Mohamed Mrabet were active in Tangier. The Americans Paul Bowles and William S. Burroughs also spent considerable time in Tangier, and other writers associated with the Beat Generation passed through as well, including Tennessee Williams, Brion Gysin, Allen Ginsberg and Jack Kerouac. The international literary scene in Tangier produced translations of works by Moroccans; Paul Bowles translated work by Choukri, Mrabet, Abdeslam Boulaich, Driss Ben Hamed Charhadi, and Ahmed Yacoubi.

Literary effervescence before the Years of Lead 
In 1966, a group of Moroccan writers such as Abdellatif Laabi founded a magazine called Souffles-Anfas ( "Breaths") that was banned by the government in 1972, but gave impetus to the poetry and modern fiction of many Moroccan writers. 

Since then, a number of writers of Moroccan origin have become well-known abroad, such as Tahar Ben Jelloun in France or Laila Lalami in the United States.

List of Moroccan writers

References

Further reading
Otto Zwartjes, Ed de Moor, e.a. (ed.) Poetry, Politics and Polemics: Cultural Transfer Between the Iberian Peninsula and North Africa, Rodopi, 1996, 
Monroe, J. T., Hispano-Arabic Poetry During the Almoravid Period: Theory and Practice, Viator 4, 1973, pp. 65–98
Mohammed Hajji, Al-Haraka al-Fikriyya bi-li-Maghrib fi'Ahd al-Saiyyin (2 vols; al-Muhammadiya: Matbaat Fadala, 1976 and 1978)
Najala al-Marini, Al-Sh'ar al-Maghribi fi 'asr al-Mansur al-Sa'di, Rabat: Nashurat Kuliat al-Adab wa al-Alum al-Insania, 1999 (Analysis of the work of the main poets of the age of Ahmed al-Mansour)
Kapchan, Deborah. 2020. Poetic Justice: An Anthology of Moroccan Contemporary Poetry. University of Texas Press.
Lakhdar, La vie littéraire au Maroc sous la dynastie alaouite, Rabat, 1971
Jacques Berque, "La Littérature Marocaine Et L'Orient Au XVIIe Siècle", in: Arabica, Volume 2, Number 3, 1955, pp. 295–312

External links
Nadia Ghanem, 180+ Books: A Look at Moroccan Literature Available in English; In arablit.org (2020)
Poetry International Web, Morocco 
Documentary video about a traditional storyteller in Marrakesh, in Moroccan Arabic with German and English subtitles
Abdellatif Akbib, Abdelmalek Essaadi, Birth and Development of the Moroccan Short Story,   University, Morocco 
Suellen Diaconoff,  Professor of French, Colby College: Women writers of Morocco writing in French, 2005 (Survey) 
The Postcolonial Web, National University of Singapore, The Literature of Morocco: An Overview 
M.R. Menocal, R.P. Scheindlin and M. Sells (ed.) The Literature of Al-Andalus, Cambridge University Press (chapter 1), 2000 
Said I. Abdelwahed, Professor of English Literature, Faculty of Arts, Al-Azhar University Gaza, Palestine, Troubadour Poetry: An Intercultural Experience  
In Spanish: Enciclopedia GER, P. Martsnez Montávez, "Marruecos (magrib Al-agsá) VI. Lengua y Literatura." retrieved on 28 February 2008

See also
 Culture of Morocco
 Music of Morocco
 Pallache family (rabbinical writings)

 
Arabic literature
Arab culture